The acacia rat (Thallomys paedulcus), or black-tailed tree rat, is a species of rodent in the family Muridae. It is a small arboreal rodent that is extensively dependent on Acacia trees.
It is found in Botswana, Democratic Republic of the Congo, Ethiopia, Kenya, Malawi, Mozambique, Namibia, Somalia, South Africa, Eswatini, Tanzania, Zambia, and Zimbabwe.
Its natural habitat is subtropical or tropical dry shrubland.

Sources

 

Karantanis, N., Rychlik, L., Herrel, A., & Youlatos, D. (2017). Arboreality in acacia rats ( Thallomys paedulcus ; Rodentia, Muridae): gaits and gait metrics. Journal of Zoology : Proceedings of the Zoological Society of London., 303(2), 107–119. https://doi.org/10.1111/jzo.12473
Meyer, J., Steinhauser, J., Jeltsch, F., & Brandl, R. (2007). Large trees, acacia shrubs, and the density of Thallomys nigricauda in the Thornveld savannah of South Africa. Journal of Arid Environments., 68(3), 363–370. https://doi.org/10.1016/j.jaridenv.2006.06.001

Thallomys
Mammals described in 1846
Taxonomy articles created by Polbot
Rodents of Africa